Spongiochrysis is a genus of green algae in the family Cladophorales. It contains a single species, Spongiochrysis hawaiiensis.

References

External links

Cladophorales genera
Cladophoraceae
Monotypic algae genera